Kevin Anderson and Matthew Ebden were the defending champions, but they chose not to participate this year.
Ivan Dodig and Marcelo Melo won the title, defeating Mariusz Fyrstenberg and Santiago González in the final, 7–6(7–2), 5–7, [10–3].

Seeds

Draw

Draw

Qualifying

Seeds

Qualifiers
 ''' Dustin Brown /  Tobias Kamke

Qualifying draw

References
 Main Draw

2015 Abierto Mexicano Telcel